Josep Dallerès Codina (born 14 February 1949) is an Andorran politician. He is a member of the Social Democratic Party of Andorra and served as General Syndic of Andorra 19 January 1994 - 10 March 1997 and from 2009 to 2011.

External links
 Page at the General Council of the Principality of Andorra

1949 births
Living people
General Syndics of the General Council (Andorra)
Place of birth missing (living people)
Social Democratic Party (Andorra) politicians